Cameron Gill (born December 14, 1997) is an American football outside linebacker for the Tampa Bay Buccaneers of the National Football League (NFL). He played college football at Wagner.

College career
Gill was a member of the Wagner Seahawks for four seasons. As a sophomore, Gill recorded 53 tackles, 13 tackles for loss, 11.0 sacks, and one forced fumble. Gill was named first-team All-Northeast Conference (NEC) and the conference Defensive player of the year after recording 61 tackles, 24 tackles for loss, and 13.5 sacks. As a senior, he recorded 60 tackles with 9.5 sacks and 20 tackles for loss and was again named the NEC Defensive Player of the Year and as well as a  STATS FCS First-team All-American, a Second-team All-American by Hero Sports, a third-team All-American by the Associated Press, and All-ECAC First-team.

Professional career

Gill was signed by the Tampa Bay Buccaneers as an undrafted free agent and made the team's active roster coming out of training camp. He made his NFL debut on October 8, 2020, against the Chicago Bears, making a tackle on special teams.

In Super Bowl LV against the Kansas City Chiefs, Gill recorded 0.5 sacks on Patrick Mahomes during the 31–9 win.

On September 3, 2021, Gill was placed on injured reserve. He was activated on October 9.

On August 22, 2022, Gill was placed on injured reserve after suffering a Lisfranc injury in the preseason.

References

External links
Wagner Seahawks bio
Tampa Bay Buccaneers bio

1997 births
Living people
American football outside linebackers
People from Douglasville, Georgia
Players of American football from Georgia (U.S. state)
Sportspeople from the Atlanta metropolitan area
Tampa Bay Buccaneers players
Wagner Seahawks football players